The 1990 Miami Dolphins season was the team's twenty-first season in the National Football League and twenty-fifth overall. After four seasons out of the playoffs with a combined record of 30 wins and 31 losses, the Dolphins returned to postseason play for the first time since 1985 with twelve wins and four losses. They defeated the Kansas City Chiefs in the Wild Card Game before being knocked out of contention by the eventual AFC champions, the Buffalo Bills, in the Divisional Playoff Game.

1990 marked the first time since their record 1972 perfect season that the Dolphins played the New York Giants, and merely the second in team history. The reason for this is that before the admission of the Texans in 2002, NFL scheduling formulas for games outside a team's division were much more influenced by table position during the previous season. Also, the scheduled game between the Giants and Dolphins in 1987 was cancelled due to a players' strike. 

As of 2022, this was also the last time the Dolphins finished with at least twelve wins in the regular season.

Offseason

NFL Draft

Personnel

Staff

Roster

Regular season

Schedule

Standings

Player stats

Passing

Receiving

Defense

Playoffs

AFC wild card game 

With 2:28 left in the game, the Dolphins capped an 85-yard drive with quarterback Dan Marino's winning 12-yard touchdown pass to wide receiver Mark Clayton.

AFC Divisional Playoff

Awards and honors 
 Jeff Cross, AFC Pro Bowl selection

Milestones 
 Dan Marino, 7th Consecutive 3,000 Yard Passing Season

References 

 Miami Dolphins on Pro Football Reference

Miami
Miami Dolphins seasons
Miami Dolphins